Shahrani may refer to:
 Al-Shahrani, a surname
 Shahrani, Iran, a village